Melani Matavao (born 19 November 1995) is a Samoan rugby union scrum-half who plays for  internationally.

Playing career
Matavao has come through Samoa's PPS Super 9 competition as a key player for the Aana Chiefs.
In 2015 Matavao was selected for the Samoan Under 20 side for the U20 World Championship in Italy. In 2016 he was selected for Samoa A. In 2018 he was given a place with Otago under World Rugby's Pacific Combine scheme, playing 7 games in the 2018 Mitre 10 Cup season. 

In 2019 he signed for the Asia Pacific Dragons, but did not play any matches with the team.

He was selected for the Samoan national team in 2017, making his debut in a test against Scotland in Edinburgh. He played for Samoa in the 2018 World Rugby Pacific Nations Cup. He was decisive in Samoa's qualification for the 2019 Rugby World Cup, scoring two tries in a qualifier against Germany.

In February 2019 he was selected for the first time for the Samoa Sevens. He was then named to Samoa's Rugby World Cup squad. After the world cup, he played in the 2020 world sevens series.

Matavao was selected for the Samoan squad to the 2022 Rugby World Cup Sevens in Cape Town.

References

External links
 

1995 births
Living people
Samoan rugby union players
Samoan rugby sevens players
Samoa international rugby union players
Rugby union scrum-halves
Rugby sevens players at the 2022 Commonwealth Games